The Volkswagen Bora for the Chinese market is a compact car manufactured and marketed by FAW-Volkswagen since 2001. Originally started as the fourth generation Volkswagen Jetta in North America and the Volkswagen Bora in other parts of the world, it went through a few heavy facelifts, and production carried on with new updates long after the international Volkswagen Bora was out of production.


First generation (1J; 2001)

The original Volkswagen Bora started out as a rebadged MK4 Jetta. There is also a heavily modified Jetta called the Volkswagen Lavida for the Chinese market, developed by Shanghai Volkswagen on the same platform.

2006 facelift 
The Bora in China received a facelift in the summer of 2006, with a Passat Mk5.5 lookalike face which is a rebadged City Jetta. The model available in Mexico, Canada, Brazil and Argentina from 2008 was likewise facelifted with the same design found in China.

Bora HS 
A hatchback version (i.e. the Golf) is also available after the facelift, and is badged as the Bora HS. Production began in 2006 and ended in 2008.

Second generation (2008)

The Bora received a complete makeover in 2008, being marketed as the New Bora, and from 2010, only as the Bora. This new model was developed by FAW-Volkswagen and is still being based on same platform as Golf IV, but using some components from the newer PQ35 platform.
Engine options for the second generation Bora are a 131hp 1.4 liter TSI engine,a 120hp 2.0 liter engine and a 100/104hp 1.6 liter engine.

2013 facelift
The Bora had a major facelift in December 2012, and a sportier and more premium trim level was created called the Volkswagen Bora Sportline.

Third generation (2016)

In March 2016 the model received another complete makeover featuring a completely redesigned exterior while continuing the platform, the engines, and the interior of the previous generation.

Two engines are available, both are updated units from the previous Bora models, with a 1.6 liter engine with 110hp and 155nm, and a 1.4 liter turbo engine with 131hp and 225nm. The 1.6 liter engine is mated to a five-speed manual transmission or a six-speed automatic transmission, and the 1.4 liter turbo engine is mated to a seven-speed DCT. 

This generation is still available as of May 2019 as the Bora Classic with three trim levels and pricing is between 106,800 and 116,800 yuan (15,440 to 16,890 USD).

Volkswagen C-Trek
The FAW-Volkswagen later launched a lifted wagon version of the updated Bora called the Volkswagen C-Trek.

Fourth generation (2018)

In April 2018, FAW-Volkswagen revealed a new Volkswagen Bora sedan based on the MQB platform. The new model is similarly sized compared with the just revealed Volkswagen Lavida Plus which also stands on the MQB platform. The new Volkswagen Bora is available in the Chinese car market in September 2018 with prices starting from around 115,000 yuan.

References

External links

 VW Bora III
 VW Bora IV

Cars introduced in 1999
2000s cars
2010s cars
Bora
Euro NCAP small family cars
Front-wheel-drive vehicles
All-wheel-drive vehicles
Compact cars
Sedans
Station wagons
Police vehicles
Rally cars
Touring cars
Cars of China